Marta Michna ( Zielińska; born 30 January 1978) is a Poland born chess player who won the Polish Women's Chess Championship in 2003. FIDE Woman Grandmaster (1999). Since 2007 she representative of Germany.

Chess career
Marta Michna became interested in chess at the age of eight. In 1990s she was one of the leading Polish youth chess player. She won European Youth Chess Championship (U-18) in 1995 in Verdun and World Youth Chess Championship (U-18) in 1996 in Cala Galdana.

In the Polish Women's Chess Championship's finals Marta Michna won six medals: gold (2003), silver (2002) and 4 bronze (1994, 1996, 1998, 2000).

In 2000s Marta Michna participated in Women's World Chess Championship by knock-out system:
 In Women's World Chess Championship 2000 advanced to the second round, where lost to Ekaterina Kovalevskaya,
 In Women's World Chess Championship 2001 in the first round won to Nona Gaprindashvili, but in second round lost to Almira Skripchenko,
 In Women's World Chess Championship 2006 in the first round lost to Ketevan Arakhamia-Grant.

Marta Michna played for Poland and Germany in Women's Chess Olympiads:
 In 1996, won individual gold medal at first reserve board (Poland) in the 32nd Chess Olympiad (women) in Yerevan (+6, =0, -1),
 In 1998, at first reserve board (Poland) in the 33rd Chess Olympiad (women) in Elista (+2, =5, -2),
 In 2000, at first reserve board (Poland) in the 34th Chess Olympiad (women) in Istanbul (+5, =2, -1),
 In 2004, won individual bronze medal at first reserve board (Poland) in the 36th Chess Olympiad (women) in Calvia (+5, =5, -0),
 In 2008, at third board (Germany) in the 38th Chess Olympiad (women) in Dresden (+5, =5, -0),
 In 2012, at fourth board (Germany) in the 40th Chess Olympiad (women) in Istanbul (+5, =5, -0).

Marta Michna played for Poland and Germany in European Team Chess Championship:
 In 2003, at second board (Poland) in the 5th European Team Chess Championship (women) in Plovdiv (+1, =2, -1),
 In 2005, won team gold medal at reserve board (Poland) in the 6th European Team Chess Championship (women) in Gothenburg (+2, =2, -2),
 In 2007, at third board (Germany) in the 7th European Team Chess Championship (women) in Heraklion (+3, =4, -1),
 In 2009, at third board (Germany) in the 8th European Team Chess Championship (women) in Novi Sad (+3, =4, -1),
 In 2011, at second board (Germany) in the 9th European Team Chess Championship (women) in Porto Carras (+4, =3, -2),
 In 2013, at reserve board (Germany) in the 10th European Team Chess Championship (women) in Warsaw (+3, =2, -2).

Personal life
At the end of the 1990s Marta had a relationship with Alexei Shirov, with whom she has a daughter Masza. In 2006, she married FIDE Master (FM) Christian Michna (born 1972) and since 2007 in the international arena represented Germany. She lives in Hamburg and has four children - Masza, Mateusz, Milosz and Maja.

References

External links
 
 
 
 

1978 births
Living people
German female chess players
Polish female chess players
Chess woman grandmasters